The 2023 WAFU Zone A Women's Cup is an international women's association football tournament held in Cape Verde from 20 January until 1 February 2023. The 8 national teams involved in the tournament were required to register a squad of at least 20 players, including two goalkeepers at minimum. Only players in these squads were eligible to take part in the tournament.

The age listed for each player is on 20 January 2023, the first day of the tournament. The number of caps and goals listed for each player do not include any matches played after the start of the tournament. The club listed is the club for which the player last played a competitive match prior to the tournament. A flag is included for coaches who are of a different nationality than their own national team.

Teams

Cape Verde 
Head coach: Silvéria Nédio

The final 23-player squad was announced on 17 January 2023.

As Cape Verde uses the Portuguese naming system the Portuguese nicknames of the players are in parentheses.

Gambia 
Head coach: Mariama Sowe

The final 20-player squad was announced on 17 January 2023.

Guinea 
Head coach: Sékou Tidiane Kaba

The final 20-player squad was announced on 18 January 2023.

Guinea-Bissau 
head coach: Romão dos Santos

Mauritania 
Head coach: Abdoulaye Diallo

Senegal 
Head coach: Mame Moussa Cissé

The final 21-player squad was announced on 19 January 2023.

Sierra Leone 
Head coach: Ernest Hallowell

The final 20-player squad was announced on 16 January 2023.

References

Women's football in Cape Verde